The South American Basketball Championship, or FIBA South American Championship, is the main FIBA tournament for men's national teams from South America's region of FIBA Americas. The tournament was first played in 1930. The tournament often has been played biannually, but the last took place in 2016.

Results

Performance by nation

Participation details

See also 

 South American Basketball Championship for Women

References

External links
 South America Basketball Championship on FIBA Americas
 Brazil's History of South American Basketball Championship

 
Recurring sporting events established in 1930
Basketball competitions in South America between national teams
1930 establishments in South America
Basketball